Charles Sanford Terry may refer to:

* Charles Sanford Terry (historian) (1864-1936), English historian and authority on Johann Sebastian Bach
 Charles Sanford Terry (translator) (1926–1982), American translator of Japanese literature